Maxwell Murray (June 19, 1885 – August 4, 1948) was a United States Army officer, who rose to the rank of major general. Murray commanded the 25th Infantry Division during the Attack on Pearl Harbor. He was the son of Major General Arthur Murray.

Early years and World War I

Maxwell Murray was born on June 19, 1885, at West Point, New York, as a son of Major General Arthur Murray, first Chief of Coast Artillery Corps and his wife Sarah Wetmore DeRussy, daughter of Union Brigadier General René Edward De Russy.

Murray attended the United States Military Academy during the years 1903–1907 and was commissioned a second lieutenant of the Cavalry on June 14, 1907. During World War I, Murray was transferred to the Field Artillery branch on January 13, 1917, and sent with 5th Field Artillery within 1st Infantry Division to the[France.

Murray was promoted to the temporary rank of colonel and was put in command of the 5th Field Artillery Regiment during the Battle of Cantigny, Battle of Soissons and Second Battle of the Marne. For his leadership, he was awarded with the Distinguished Service Medal and Silver Star. He was also decorated with the Croix de guerre with Guilt Star and Fourragère by the government of France.

Interwar service

After the war, upon his return from the European battlefield, Murray was reverted to the rank of major in the Field Artillery and was put in command of the Artillery training center at Fort Bragg, North Carolina. Between 1919 and 1920, Murray took a special course at the Massachusetts Institute of Technology and after graduation, he was transferred to the Office of Chief of Field Artillery, under the command of Major General William J. Snow.

In 1924, Murray attended the Field Artillery School at Fort Sill, Oklahoma, where he earned more knowledges about Field Artillery. Subsequently, he attended the Command and General Staff College at Fort Leavenworth, Kansas.

His next assignment was as an aide to Governor-General of the Philippines, Dwight F. Davis from 1929 to 1932.

Subsequently, Murray was transferred back to Fort Bragg, North Carolina, where he was appointed a member of Field Artillery Board. In this capacity, Murray was promoted to the rank of colonel. In 1936, he was transferred to the 5th Field Artillery Regiment, where he was appointed an executive officer of the unit and an commanding officer next year.

World War II

With the Japanese Attack on attack on Pearl Harbor in December 1941, Murray served as a commanding general of the 25th Infantry Division (former Hawaiian Division). During his command, 25th Division performed  intensive training due to its deployment in Pacific. He served in this capacity until the end of April 1942, when he was replaced by major general J. Lawton Collins. In addition, Murray was awarded with his first Legion of Merit for his service as CG of 25th Infantry Division.

Major General Murray subsequently served as a commanding general of the 35th Infantry Division stationed at Camp San Luis Obispo, California. He was succeeded by Major General Paul W. Baade in January 1943 and transferred to Pasadena, Southern California, where he commanded the local sector within Western Defense Command under the command of general John L. DeWitt. Murray also received an Oak Leaf Cluster to the Legion of Merit for his service in Western Defense Command.

In 1943, Major General Murray was transferred to the combat area in New Caledonia in Central Pacific area, where he commanded the Guadalcanal Island Forward Area. This command included the Fiji Islands. For his service in this capacity, Murray was awarded with the Second Oak Leaf Cluster to the Legion of Merit.

In November 1945, Murray returned to the United States and was assigned to headquarters of the Army Ground Forces in Washington, D.C. Murray finally retired from the Army on September 30, 1946.

Retirement

Major General Maxwell Murray died, due to a heart attack, on August 4, 1948, at the age of 63 years at his home in Siasconset, Massachusetts. He and his wife Phyllis Muriel Howard (1890–1976) with whom, he had a son Colonel Arthur Maxwell Murray (USMA, Class 1938) and a daughter, Ann Howard. He is buried together with his family at Arlington National Cemetery in Virginia.

Decorations

Here is the ribbon bar of Major General Maxwell Murray:

References

External links
ANC Explorer
Generals of World War II

1885 births
1948 deaths
Military personnel from New York (state)
United States Army Field Artillery Branch personnel
People from West Point, New York
Attack on Pearl Harbor
United States Army generals
United States Military Academy alumni
United States Army Command and General Staff College alumni
United States Army War College alumni
Massachusetts Institute of Technology alumni
United States Army personnel of World War I
Burials at Arlington National Cemetery
Recipients of the Distinguished Service Medal (US Army)
Recipients of the Silver Star
Recipients of the Legion of Merit
Honorary Commanders of the Order of the British Empire
Recipients of the Croix de Guerre 1914–1918 (France)
United States Army generals of World War II